Reginald Thomas (born May 20, 1953) is an American politician from the state of Kentucky. A member of the Democratic Party, Thomas is a member of the Kentucky Senate and currently serves as the minority caucus chair. Thomas' election in 2012 marked the first time that two African Americans served in the Kentucky Senate concurrently. Thomas is an attorney and law professor; he earned an A.B. degree from Dartmouth College in 1975 and a J.D. degree from Harvard Law School in 1978.

On July 1, 2017, Thomas announced he would challenge Rep. Andy Barr in Kentucky's 6th congressional district during the United States House of Representatives elections in Kentucky, 2018. He lost the Democratic primary to Amy McGrath, who lost the general election to Barr.

References

External links 
 Reggie Thomas for Congress campaign site
 Senate District 13: Reginald Thomas (D) at Kentucky Legislature
 Reginald Thomas at Kentucky Senate Democrats website
 Reginald Thomas at Project Vote Smart
 Reggie Thomas at Ballotpedia

1953 births
Living people
Place of birth missing (living people)
Democratic Party Kentucky state senators
Dartmouth College alumni
Harvard Law School alumni
Politicians from Lexington, Kentucky
African-American Methodists
21st-century American politicians
21st-century African-American politicians